Diego de León is a station on Line 4, Line 5, and Line 6 of the Madrid Metro, located at the intersections of Francisco Silvela, Diego de León, and Conde de Peñalver streets in the Salamanca district of Madrid. It is in Zone A.

The station is named after Diego de León street, which in turn is named after the 19th-century Spanish military and political figure Diego de León.

History 
The station was inaugurated on 17 September 1932 as part of a branch line of Line 2 that ran from Diego de León to Goya, where it connected to the rest of Line 2. The branch was considered to be part of Line 2 until 1958, when it was transferred to Line 4.

In 1970, Line 5 was extended to Diego de León. The Line 5 platforms under Juan Bravo street were inaugurated on 26 February, and service began on 2 March. On 26 March 1973, Diego de León ceased to be a terminus station for Line 4 when the line was extended to Alfonso XIII. On 10 October 1979, the first stretch of Line 6 from Pacífico to Cuatro Caminos was inaugurated, including a stop at Diego de León.

References 

Line 4 (Madrid Metro) stations
Line 5 (Madrid Metro) stations
Line 6 (Madrid Metro) stations
Railway stations in Spain opened in 1932